is a Nippon Professional Baseball player.  He is currently with the Hiroshima Toyo Carp of Japan's Central League.

References

External links

Living people
1977 births
Baseball people from Tokyo
Doshisha University alumni
Japanese baseball players
Nippon Professional Baseball pitchers
Seibu Lions players
Hiroshima Toyo Carp players
Japanese baseball coaches
Nippon Professional Baseball coaches